is a Japanese black-and-white arthouse film released in 1970.  It was directed by Yoshishige Yoshida and written by Masahiro Yamada. It's the second film in Yoshida's trilogy of Japanese radicalism, preceded by Eros + Massacre (1969) and followed by Coup d'Etat (1973).

References

External links

Films directed by Yoshishige Yoshida
1970 films
1970s erotic films
1970s Japanese films